Micrelenchus is a genus of small sea snails that have shells with pearly interiors and an operculum. They are marine gastropod molluscs in the subfamily Cantharidinae  of the family Trochidae, the top snails or top shells.

This genus is only known to occur in New Zealand.

Species
Species and subspecies within the genus Micrelenchus include:
 Micrelenchus burchorum (B. A. Marshall, 1998)
 Micrelenchus huttonii (E. A. Smith, 1876)
 Micrelenchus purpureus (Gmelin, 1791)
 Micrelenchus sanguineus (Gray, 1843)
 Micrelenchus tenebrosus (A. Adams, 1853)
 Micrelenchus tesselatus (A. Adams, 1853)
Species brought into synonymy
 Micrelenchus artizona (A. Adams, 1853): synonym of Roseaplagis artizona (A. Adams, 1853)
 Micrelenchus caelatus (Hutton, 1884): synonym of Cantharidus caelatus Hutton, 1884
 Micrelenchus caelatus archibenthicola Dell, 1956: synonym of Cantharidus caelatus mortenseni
 Micrelenchus caelatus bakeri Fleming, 1948: synonym of Cantharidus artizona A. Adams, 1853 (Odhner, N.H.J., 1924)
 Micrelenchus caelatus elongatus (Suter, 1897): synonym of Cantharidus caelatus elongatus (Suter, 1897)
 Micrelenchus caelatus morioria Powell, 1933: synonym of Cantharidus caelatus mortenseni
 Micrelenchus caelatus mortenseni (Odhner, 1924): synonym of Cantharidus mortenseni (Odhner, 1924)
 Micrelenchus capillaceus (Philippi, 1849): synonym of Cantharidus capillaceus (Philippi, 1849)
 Micrelenchus dilatatus (Sowerby, 1870): synonym of Cantharidus dilatatus (G.B. Sowerby II, 1870)
 Micrelenchus festivus Marshall, 1998: synonym of Cantharidus festivus (B. A. Marshall, 1998)
 Micrelenchus micans (Suter, 1897): synonym of Cantharidus artizona A. Adams, 1853
 Micrelenchus mortenseni (Odhner, 1924): synonym of Cantharidus mortenseni (Odhner, 1924) accepted as Roseaplagis mortenseni (Odhner, 1924)
  Micrelenchus oliveri (Iredale, 1915): synonym of Cantharidus sanguineus (Gray, 1843) synonym of Micrelenchus sanguineus (Gray, 1843)
 Micrelenchus parcipictus Powell, 1946: synonym of Cantharidus parcipictus (Powel, 1946)
 Micrelenchus rufozona (A. Adams, 1853): synonym of Cantharidus rufozona A. Adams, 1853: synonym of Roseaplagis rufozona (A. Adams, 1853)

References

External links
 Bruce A. Marshall  : The New Zealand Recent species of  Cantharidus  Montfort, 1810 and  Micrelenchus  Finlay, 1926 (Mollusca: Gastropoda: Trochidae); The Malacological Society of Australasia, Volume 19, Issue 1: 19 May 1998 

 
Trochidae
Extant Miocene first appearances
Taxa named by Harold John Finlay